Nature's Best 3 is a two-disc compilation album of 35 New Zealand popular music songs, numbers 66-100 on the APRA 75th Anniversary Top 100 New Zealand Songs of All Time. See Nature's Best for more information on the selection process of this list.

Nature's Best 3 was released as part of a Nature's Best Box Set on 29 November 2005.

Track listing

Disc one
"Don't Fight It Marsha, It's Bigger Than The Both Of Us" – Blam Blam Blam (Don McGlashan, 1981)
"Gutter Black" – Hello Sailor (Dave McArtney, 1977)
"Long Ago" – Herbs (Lundon/Hona, 1984)
"There Is No Depression In New Zealand" – Blam Blam Blam 
"You Oughta Be In Love" – Dave Dobbyn (Dave Dobbyn, 1986)
"Andrew" – Fur Patrol (Andrew Bain/Julia Deans/Simon Braxton/Steven Wells, 2000)
"Billy Bold" – Graham Brazier (Graham Brazier, 1981)
"Distant Sun" – Crowded House (Neil Finn, 1993)
"Suddenly Strange" – Bic Runga (Bic Runga, 1997)
"Forever Tuesday Morning" – The Mockers (Gary Curtis/Andrew Fagan/Tim Wedde, 1984)
"Cruise Control" – Headless Chickens (Chris Matthews/Michael Lawry, 1991)
"Pressure Man" – The Feelers (James Reid/Matt Thomas/Hamish Gee, 1998)
"Private Universe" – Crowded House (Neil Finn, 1994)
"Room That Echoes" – Peking Man (Neville Hall, 1985)
"Sensitive to a Smile" – Herbs (Dilworth Karaka/Tumahai, 1987)
"E Ipo" – Prince Tui Teka (Ngoi Pēwhairangi/Missy/Prince Tui Teka, 1982)
"Andy" – Front Lawn (Harry Sinclair/Don McGlashan, 1987)

Disc two
"Bitter" – Shihad (Karl Kippenberger/Tom Larkin/Phil Knight/Jon Toogood, 1995)
"Four Seasons In One Day" – Crowded House (Neil Finn/Tim Finn, 1991)
"Heavenly Pop Hit" – The Chills (Martin Phillipps, 1990)
"Husband House" – Sneaky Feelings (Matthew Bannister, 1995)
"Jumping Out a Window" – Pop Mechanix 
"If I Were You" – Straitjacket Fits (Shayne Carter/John Collie/Straitjacket Fits, 1993)
"I'll Say Goodbye (Even Tho I'm Blue)" – Dance Exponents (Jordan Luck, 1983)
"Maybe" – Sharon O'Neill (Sharon O'Neill, 1981)
"One Day Ahead" – Eye TV (Sean Sturm/Luke Casey/Michael Scott/Grant Winterburn, 2000)
"Renegade Fighter" – Zed (Ben Campbell/Nathan King, 2000)
"Part of Me" – Stellar* (Boh Runga, 1999)
"Sierra Leone" – Coconut Rough (Andrew McLennan, 1983)
"Words" – Sharon O'Neill (Sharon O'Neill, 1979)
"Spellbound" – Split Enz (Tim Finn/Phil Judd, 1979)
"Rust In My Car" – Citizen Band (Geoff Chunn, 1979)
"Mercy of Love" – Shona Laing (Shona Laing, 1992)
"Can't Get Enough" – Supergroove (Joseph Fisher/Karl Steven, 1996)
"Naked Flame" – Dave Dobbyn

See also
 Nature's Best 2
 Nature's Best
 More Nature
 Australasian Performing Right Association

Nature's Best
Sony Music New Zealand albums
2003 compilation albums
Sony Music New Zealand compilation albums